Astrothelium vulcanum is a species of corticolous (bark-dwelling) lichen in the family Trypetheliaceae. Found in Guyana, it was formally described as a new species in 2016 by André Aptroot. Its ascospores are spindle-shaped (fusiform) with rounded edges, with three septa and dimensions of 20–25 by 6.5–7.5 µm. Astrothelium vulcanum contains lichexanthone, a lichen product that causes the thallus to fluoresce when lit with a long-wavelength UV light.

References

vulcanum
Lichen species
Lichens described in 2016
Lichens of Guyana
Taxa named by André Aptroot